Krasnystaw  is a town in southeastern Poland with 18 630 inhabitants (31 december 2019). Situated in the Lublin Voivodeship (since 1999), previously in Chełm Voivodeship (1975–1998). It is the capital of Krasnystaw County.

The town is famous for its beer festival called Chmielaki ( means hop), and for its dairy products like yogurt and kefir. Krasnystaw is near the border with Ukraine. The river Wieprz flows through Krasnystaw.

History 

Krasnystaw received its town charter from King Władysław II Jagiełło, who signed the document in Kraków, on 1 March 1394. The new town was located in the location of previously existing village of Szczekarzew, and in 1490 – 1826, was property of the Bishops of Chełm, and the seat of a starosta. Due to convenient location along merchant route from Lublin to Lwów, it prospered in the 16th century.

The period known as Swedish wars (1655–1660) brought destruction of both the town and the Krasnystaw Castle. Following the third partition of Poland, Krasnystaw was in 1795 annexed by the Habsburg Empire, but since 1815 until 1916, it was part of Russian-controlled Congress Poland. During the January Uprising the town and its area saw heavy fighting between Polish rebels and Russian troops.

In 1916, Krasnystaw received rail connection, and in 1919, already in the Second Polish Republic, the town became seat of a county.

On 18–19 September 1939, during the Invasion of Poland, Polish troops of the 39th Infantry Division fought here with advancing Wehrmacht units. During World War II, numerous units of the Home Army and others operated in the area. The Germans blamed Jews for the resistance, and hanged seven.  They then placed 40 Jews on the German front lines.  About one third were killed. During the first months of their occupation, the Germans murdered both Christian and Jewish Poles.

In 1940, the Germans established a Jewish ghetto in the poorest part of town. Over the next few years, Jews from other communities were moved to the ghetto, others moved out of it to other camps and ghettos.  Finally, in May 1942, it became a transit ghetto where Jews were brought on their way to Majdanek or to the Sobibor extermination camp, where all were immediately murdered.  Later in 1942, some of the remaining Krasnystaw Jews were sent to the Belzec extermination camp.  Only a handful of Krasnystaw's Jewish population of about 2500 survived.

In 1943, a local German prison was raided, and 300 inmates were released, in spring 1944, several German trains were destroyed. After the war, anti-Communist units operated here until 1950.

Distances 
Lublin – 
Chełm – 
Zamość – 
Ukraine –

Economy 
In Krasnystaw dominates the food industry:  
 Sugar Factory "Krasnystaw"  
 District Dairy Cooperative Krasnystaw  
 Fermentation tobacco  
 grain elevator Triticarr

Jewish community 

The old synagogue of Krasnystaw, which was still standing at the beginning of the 20th century, had a number of 14th- and 15th-century architectural features. The municipal customs records of Krasnystaw for 1548 show a number of Jews resident in the town. In 1554, Jews were prohibited from owning dwelling houses in the town and suburbs, though in 1584 they were allowed to reside in the suburbs only. In 1761, three Jews from Wojslawice and one from Czarnoloz were convicted in a blood libel trial in Krasnystaw; another accused person, the rabbi of Wojslawice, committed suicide in prison. In 1776, the Jewish population of Krasnystaw numbered 63.

In the first half of the 19th century, a bitter struggle emerged between the Jews and the gentile townsfolk, who wished to keep their privilege of not having Jews reside in the town. In 1824, Jews were permitted to reside temporarily in several villages near the town, but the last restrictions on Jewish residence in Krasnystaw itself were not rescinded until 1862. Eleven Jews resided in the town in 1827, by 1857 the community had grown to 151 (4% of the population), and by 1897 to 1,176 (25% of the total). At that time 80% of local trade was in Jewish hands.

In 1921, the 1,754 Jews constituted 20% of the town's population.  After the murder of almost all the pre-World War II Jewish population, no Jews currently reside in Krasnystaw.

Sport 
Krasnystaw has a 4th league football team called Start Krasnystaw. In 2008 a new stadium/recreation center was built for the team. This new stadium has over 3,000 seats. The recreation center includes an indoor basketball court, a European handball court, gym, volleyball net, and spa.

Notable people and residents 
A list of people that were born in the town or that live here.
 Jan Adamiak (born 1948), politician
 Melvin Dresher, mathematician
 Marta Kaczmarek, actor
 Avoth Yeshurun (aka Yehiel Perlmutter), Hebrew poet
 Szmul Zygielbojm, Bund leader

Sights 
 Baroque complex of Jesuit Abbey, with a 1720 collegium, and church of Francis Xavier,
 bishophoric palace (early 17th century), founded by Bishop Stanislaw Gamolinski,
 seminary (1719–1739),
 parish church, founded in 1458, destroyed by Crimean Tatars, remodelled in 1826 and 1951.
 archaeological site, located where the 14th century Krasnystaw Castle once stood.
 synagogue and Jewish cemetery,
 1920s town hall.
 Regional Museum.

References

Cities and towns in Lublin Voivodeship
Krasnystaw County
Ruthenian Voivodeship
Lublin Governorate
Lublin Voivodeship (1919–1939)
Holocaust locations in Poland